Joseph Warren Coker (November 10, 1930 – August 26, 2019) was an American politician. He served as a member of the South Carolina House of Representatives.

Life and career 
Coker was born in Manning, South Carolina, the son of Sarah Bradham and Robert Carlisle Coker. He served in the United States Army during the Korean War, receiving the Combat Infantryman Badge, the Bronze Star and other medals.

Coker started his career as a teacher and coach as well as becoming a school principal. He also became a building contractor and he owned and ran the Turbeville Insurance Agency.

In 1967, Coker was elected to the South Carolina House of Representatives, representing Clarendon County, South Carolina, serving until 1972.

He went on to serve as a Clarendon County Clerk for two terms before retiring.

Governor Carroll Campbell awarded him the Order of the Palmetto in 1994.

Coker died in August 2019 at his home, at the age of 88, survived by his wife and two sons.

References 

1930 births
2019 deaths
People from Manning, South Carolina
Members of the South Carolina House of Representatives
20th-century American politicians